The Brazil national football team played in the 1978 FIFA World Cup, and continued to maintained their record of being the only team to enter every World Cup Finals.

Brazil finished in third place, having failed to top their group in the second group phase.

Qualifying
1978 FIFA World Cup qualification (CONMEBOL Group 1)
February 20, 1977, Bogotá, Colombia -  0 - 0 
March 9, 1977, Rio de Janeiro, Brazil -  6 - 0 
March 13, 1977, Asunción, Paraguay -  0 - 1 
March 20, 1977, Rio de Janeiro, Brazil -  1 - 1 

Brazil advanced to the final round.

1978 FIFA World Cup qualification (Final round)
July 10, 1977, Cali, Colombia -  1 - 0 
July 14, 1977, Cali, Colombia -  8 - 0 

Brazil and Peru qualified.

The Cup

First round

Group 3

Second round

Group B

Argentina qualified for the final match, and Brazil qualified for the third place match.

Third-place match

Starting 11

|}

Scorers

3 goals
 Dirceu
 Roberto Dinamite

2 goals
 Nelinho

1 goal
 Reinaldo
 Zico

External links
1978 FIFA World Cup on FIFA.com
Details at RSSSF
History of the World Cup-1978
Planet World Cup - Argentina 1978

 
Countries at the 1978 FIFA World Cup